David Kouassi (born 26 June 1970) is an Ivorian judoka. He competed in the men's lightweight event at the 1996 Summer Olympics.

References

1970 births
Living people
Ivorian male judoka
Olympic judoka of Ivory Coast
Judoka at the 1996 Summer Olympics
Place of birth missing (living people)